The 1999 McDonald's All-American Boys Game was an All-star basketball game played on Wednesday, March 24, 1999 at the Hilton Coliseum in Ames, Iowa. The game's rosters featured the best and most highly recruited high school boys graduating in 1999. The game was the 22nd annual version of the McDonald's All-American Game first played in 1978.

1999 game
The game was telecast live by ESPN. During the halftime break, the jersey number 23 was retired in honor of Michael Jordan. Casey Jacobsen was the last player to wear 23 during a McDonald's All-American Game. The 1999 game saw several records: it was the highest scoring game in the event history, and Jonathan Bender broke Jordan's record of 30 points by scoring 31, 18 of which in the first half. Bender also had 10 rebounds, recording a double-double. Other players that starred were Carlos Boozer and Casey Jacobsen, who scored 22 points each; Jason Williams, who scored 20 points; DerMarr Johnson, who scored 19; and Marvin Stone, who recorded 13 points and 10 rebounds. Of the 21 players, 15 went on to play at least 1 game in the NBA. The dominant performance convinced Bender to skip college, despite having committed to play for Mississippi State, and declare for the 1999 NBA Draft: he was drafted out of high school with the 5th overall pick.

East roster

West roster

Coaches
The East team was coached by:
 Head Coach William Fox, Jr. of Father Judge High School (Philadelphia, Pennsylvania)
 Asst Coach Bill Koch of Father Judge High School (Philadelphia, Pennsylvania)

The West team was coached by:
 Head Coach Don Showalter of Mid-Prairie High School (Wellman, Iowa)
 Asst Coach Chris Kern of Mid-Prairie High School (Wellman, Iowa)

All-American Week

Contest winners 
 The 1999 Slam Dunk contest was won by Donnell Harvey.
 The 1999 3-point shoot-out was won by Jason Kapono.

References

External links
McDonald's All-American on the web
McDonald's All-American all-time rosters 
McDonald's All-American rosters at Basketball-Reference.com
Game stats at Realgm.com

1998–99 in American basketball
1999
1999 in sports in Iowa
Basketball competitions in Iowa
Ames, Iowa